Raz, dwa, trzy was a Polish sports weekly, published in the interbellum period in Kraków, by the Ilustrowany Kurier Codzienny publishing house. Its first issue came out on April 21, 1931, the last one was printed in late August 1939. Following German and Soviet aggression on Poland, the weekly ceased to exist.

Publications established in 1931
Defunct newspapers published in Poland
Mass media in Kraków
Weekly newspapers published in Poland
1931 establishments in Poland